Group B of the 2010 Fed Cup Europe/Africa Zone Group II was one of two pools in the Europe/Africa Zone Group II of the 2010 Fed Cup. Four teams competed in a round robin competition, with the top team and the bottom two teams proceeding to their respective sections of the play-offs: the top teams played for advancement to Group I, while the bottom teams faced potential relegation to Group III.

Georgia vs. Finland

Armenia vs. Norway

Georgia vs. Armenia

Georgia vs. Norway

Armenia vs. Finland

Norway vs. Finland

See also
Fed Cup structure

References

External links
 Fed Cup website

2010 Fed Cup Europe/Africa Zone